Lydia Gould (born 1952-1957) is a racing cyclist specialising in cross country and marathon mountain bike racing, and is a prolific medallist at the national championships and national points series. In 2007, she opted to ride in the Expert category as opposed to the veteran in order to gain stiffer competition.

Palmarès

2000 World Cyclo-Cross Champion [40-49 age category]
2nd XC, British National Mountain Biking Championships (Elite)

2001
1st  XC, British National Mountain Biking Championships - Veteran
2002 World Cyclo-Cross Champion [40-49 age category]
2005
2nd XC, British National Mountain Biking Championships - Veteran
1st XC National Points Series, Round 1, Newnham Park - Veteran
5th Marathon, British National Mountain Biking Championships

2006
1st XC National Points Series, Round 2, Sherwood Pines - Veteran
1st XC National Points Series, Round 2, Margam Park - Veteran
4th Marathon, British National Mountain Biking Championships

2007
6th Marathon, British National Mountain Biking Championships
2nd Trek Marathon Series, Round 1

References

1950s births
Living people
Cross-country mountain bikers
Marathon mountain bikers
English female cyclists
Sportspeople from Cambridge